Koludan (also Romanized as Kolūdān; also known as Kaldūn, Koldūn, Kūldān, and Kuldūn) is a village in Baraan-e Jonubi Rural District, in the Central District of Isfahan County, Isfahan Province, Iran. At the 2006 census, its population was 70, in 16 families.

References 

Populated places in Isfahan County